Catocala tapestrina is a moth of the family Erebidae first described by Frederic Moore in 1882. It is found in China, Bhutan, Nepal and in India.

Subspecies
Catocala tapestrina tapestrina Moore, 1882 (from India)
Catocala tapestrina forresti Mell, 1939 (from China)

References

tapestrina
Moths of Asia
Moths described in 1882